The County of Tambo is one of the 37 counties of Victoria which are part of the cadastral divisions of Australia, used for land titles. It is located in eastern Gippsland, between the Tambo River in the west, and the Snowy River in the east. It includes Lakes Entrance. Some time earlier maps showed proposed counties of Abinger and Combermere occupying the area.

Parishes 
Parishes include:
 Berrmarr, Victoria
 Bete Bolong North, Victoria
 Bete Bolong South, Victoria
 Bindi, Victoria
 Buchan, Victoria
 Chilpin, Victoria
 Colquhoun, Victoria
 Colquhoun East, Victoria
 Colquhoun North, Victoria
 Detarka, Victoria
 Ensay, Victoria
 Eucambene, Victoria
 Eumana, Victoria
 Forest Hill, Victoria
 Gelantipy East, Victoria
 Gelantipy West, Victoria
 Gillingal, Victoria
 Glenmore, Victoria
 Ingeegoobee, Victoria
 Kaerwut, Victoria
 Karawah, Victoria
 Maneroo, Victoria
 Marroo, Victoria
 Mellick-Munjie, Victoria
 Menaak, Victoria
 Murrindal East, Victoria
 Murrindal West, Victoria
 Nappa, Victoria
 Newmerella, Victoria
 Ninnie, Victoria
 Nowa Nowa, Victoria
 Nowa Nowa South, Victoria
 Noyong, Victoria
 Numbie-Munjie, Victoria
 Tildesley East, Victoria
 Tildesley West, Victoria
 Timbarra, Victoria
 Tongio-Munjie East, Victoria
 Toonginbooka, Victoria
 Waygara, Victoria
 Windarra, Victoria
 Woongulmerang East, Victoria
 Woongulmerang West, Victoria

References
Vicnames, place name details
Research aids, Victoria 1910
  Cadastral map showing county and parish boundaries, categories of land holdings and reserves. 1880s, National Library of Australia

Counties of Victoria (Australia)